Brinner Henrique Santos Souza (born 16 July 1987), simply known as Brinner, is a Brazilian footballer who plays for Thai League 2 club Uthai Thani as a centre back.

Club career
Born in Lavras, Minas Gerais, Brinner only played amateur football well into his 20s. In June 2011, he joined Paraná, and after appearing regularly for the side he moved to Botafogo in December, by agreeing to a four-year deal. In June 2016, he joined Bandırmaspor

After suffering an injury during the campaign, Brinner was loaned to Bahia in January 2013. However, he was deemed surplus to requirements and returned to Bota in April. Late in the month Brinner returned to his former club Paraná.

On 6 July 2014, Brinner joined Portuguesa also in a temporary deal. After appearing regularly he moved to Macaé Esporte, newly promoted to the second level, on 22 December.

Honours

Club
Chiangrai United
Thai League 1 (1): 2019
 Thai FA Cup (1): 2020–21
Thailand Champions Cup (1): 2020

Individual
Thai League 1 Player of the Month (1): August 2019

References

External links
 
 Brinner at playmakerstats.com (English version of ogol.com.br)
 

1987 births
Living people
People from Lavras
Brazilian footballers
Association football defenders
Association football midfielders
Association football utility players
Campeonato Brasileiro Série A players
Campeonato Brasileiro Série B players
São Raimundo Esporte Clube footballers
Tupi Football Club players
Paraná Clube players
Botafogo de Futebol e Regatas players
Esporte Clube Bahia players
Associação Portuguesa de Desportos players
Macaé Esporte Futebol Clube players
Tupynambás Futebol Clube players
Thai League 1 players
Ubon United F.C. players
Chiangrai United F.C. players
Lampang F.C. players
Sportspeople from Minas Gerais